Guo Guoting (Chinese: 郭国汀), is a former Chinese lawyer,
 and chief partner of the Shanghai Tian Yi Law Firm. He was one of few lawyers who would defend dissidents and Falun Gong practitioners. He represented the imprisoned lawyer Zheng Enchong and journalist Shi Tao. Because of these activities, the Shanghai authorities revoked his license to practice law. A year after he lost his right to practice and also his freedom of movement, he left for Canada.

See also
Human rights in the People's Republic of China
List of Chinese dissidents
Political dissidents

References

External links
winning press freedom conference
 Petitioner Roundup as NPC Meets March 11, 2005
GUO GUOTING - Lawyer  Lawyer's right watch Canada

20th-century Chinese lawyers
21st-century Chinese lawyers
Chinese emigrants to Canada
Living people
Chinese dissidents
Chinese democracy activists
Chinese human rights activists
Weiquan movement
Year of birth missing (living people)